Francine Stock is a British radio and television presenter and novelist, of part-French origin.

Early life
Born in Devon, and with early years in Edinburgh and Australia, Stock later attended St Catherine's School, Guildford, where she was head girl, and is a graduate of Jesus College, Oxford, with a degree in Modern Languages (French and Italian).

Career in journalism 
After working in specialist journalism on the oil industry, Stock joined the BBC in 1983. At first she reported on financial news and worked as a radio producer, later moving into television as presenter of Newsnight and (briefly, after serious illness) on The Money Programme on BBC2. In the mid-1990s she presented BBC2's The Antiques Show with Tim Wonnacott and was one of the original presenters of BBC Radio 4's Front Row in 1998.

She later moved to The Film Programme on radio, until it was cancelled in 2021. She is also the regular host of the BAFTA Life in Pictures strand, and regularly writes about film for Prospect magazine. She also presents "The Cultural Front" on BBC Radio 4 which examines World War I and the Arts.

Other roles
Since 2005, she has been chair of the Tate Members Council and became the first female Honorary Fellow of Jesus College in 2007. As a novelist, Stock has published two works of fiction: A Foreign Country (1999, shortlisted for the Whitbread First Novel award) and Man-Made Fibre (2002).

She is married to Robert Lance Hughes; the couple have two grown-up daughters.

Bibliography
 Novels
 A Foreign Country (1999)
 Man-made Fibre (2002)

 Non-Fiction
 In Glorious Technicolor: a Century of Film and How it Has Shaped Us (2011)

References

External links
Francine Stock's Film Programme Twitter account

1958 births
Alumni of Jesus College, Oxford
BBC newsreaders and journalists
BBC World News
British journalists
Living people
People educated at St Catherine's School, Bramley
Television personalities from Devon